William McNichols may refer to:
 William H. McNichols Jr., mayor of Denver, Colorado
 William Hart McNichols, American Catholic priest and artist